Jørn Jegsen (20 December 1920 – 30 March 1976) was a Danish footballer. He played in two matches for the Denmark national football team from 1943 to 1945.

References

External links
 

1920 births
1976 deaths
Danish men's footballers
Denmark international footballers
Place of birth missing
Association footballers not categorized by position